Neijia (內家) is a term in Chinese martial arts, grouping those styles that practice neijing, usually translated as internal martial arts, occupied with spiritual, mental or qi-related aspects, as opposed to an "external" approach focused on physiological aspects. The distinction dates to the 17th century, but its modern application is due to publications by Sun Lutang, dating to the period of 1915 to 1928.  Neijing is developed by using neigong, or "internal exercises", as opposed to "external exercises" (wàigōng 外功).

Wudangquan is a more specific grouping of internal martial arts named for their association with the Taoist monasteries of the Wudang Mountains, Hubei in Chinese popular legend. These styles were enumerated by  Sun Lutang as Taijiquan, Xingyiquan and Baguazhang, but most also include Bajiquan and the legendary Wudang Sword.

Some other Chinese arts, not in the Wudangquan group, such as Qigong, Liuhebafa, Bak Mei Pai, Zi Ran Men (Nature Boxing), Bok Foo Pai and Yiquan are frequently classified (or classify themselves) as "internal".

History

Qing China
The term neijia and the distinction between internal and external martial arts first appears in Huang Zongxi's 1669 Epitaph for Wang Zhengnan.  Stanley Henning proposes that the Epitaph'''s identification of the internal martial arts with the Taoism indigenous to China and of the external martial arts with the foreign Buddhism of Shaolin—and the Manchu Qing Dynasty to which Huang Zongxi was opposed—was an act of political defiance rather than one of technical classification.

In 1676 Huang Zongxi's son, Huang Baijia, who learned martial arts from Wang Zhengnan, compiled the earliest extant manual of internal martial arts, the Nèijiā quánfǎ.

Republic of China
Beginning in 1914, Sun Lutang together with Yang Shao-hou, Yang Chengfu and Wu Chien-ch'uan taught t'ai chi to the public at the Beijing Physical Education Research Institute. Sun taught there until 1928, a seminal period in the development of modern Yang, Wu and Sun-style tai ji quan.  Sun Lutang from 1915 also published martial arts texts.

In 1928, Kuomintang generals Li Jing-lin, Chang Chih-chiang, and Fung Zu Ziang organized a national martial arts tournament in China; they did so to screen the best martial artists in order to begin building the Central Martial Arts Academy (Zhongyang Guoshuguan). The generals separated the participants of the tournament into Shaolin and Wudang.  Wudang participants were recognized as having "internal" skills. These participants were generally practitioners of t'ai chi ch'uan, Xingyiquan and Baguazhang. All other participants competed under the classification of Shaolin. One of the winners in the "internal" category was the Baguazhang master Fu Chen Sung.

Sun Lutang
Sun Lutang identified the following as the criteria that distinguish an internal martial art:
 An emphasis on the use of the mind to coordinate the leverage of the relaxed body as opposed to the use of strength.
 The internal development, circulation, and expression of qi, the "vital energy" of classical Chinese philosophy.
 The application of Taoist daoyin, qigong, and neigong principles of external movement.

Sun Lutang's eponymous style of t'ai chi ch'uan fuses principles from all three arts he named as neijia. Similarities applying classical principles between taiji, xingyi, and baquazhang include:  Loosening (song) the soft tissue, opening shoulder and  hip gates or gua, cultivating qi or intrinsic energy, issuing various jin or compounded  energies.  Taijiquan is characterized by an ever-present peng jin or expanding energy.  Xingyiquan is characterized by its solely forward moving pressing ji jin energy.  Baguazhang is characterized by its “dragon body” circular movements.  Some Chinese martial arts other than the ones Sun named also teach what are termed internal practices, despite being generally classified as external (e.g. Wing Chun that also is internal ). Some non-Chinese martial arts also claim to be internal, for example Aikido and Kito Ryu. Many martial artists, especially outside of China, disregard the distinction entirely. Some neijia schools refer to their arts as "soft style" martial arts.

Training

Internal styles focus on awareness of the spirit, mind, chi ("energy" 氣)  and the use of relaxed leverage rather than  muscular tension.  Pushing hands is a training method commonly used in neijia arts to develop sensitivity and softness.

Much time may nevertheless be spent on basic physical training, such as stance training (zhan zhuang), stretching and strengthening of muscles, as well as on empty hand and weapon forms which can be quite demanding.

Some forms in internal styles are performed slowly, although some include sudden outbursts of explosive movements (fa jin), such as those the Chen style of Taijiquan is famous for teaching earlier than some other styles (e.g. Yang and Wu). The reason for the generally slow pace is to improve coordination and balance by increasing the work load, and to require the student to pay minute attention to their whole body and its weight as they perform a technique. At an advanced level, and in actual fighting, internal styles are performed quickly, but the goal is to learn to involve the entire body in every motion, to stay relaxed, with deep, controlled breathing, and to coordinate the motions of the body and the breathing accurately according to the dictates of the forms while maintaining perfect balance.

Characteristics

External styles are characterized by fast and explosive movements and a focus on physical strength and agility. External styles include both the traditional styles focusing on application and fighting, as well as the modern styles adapted for competition and exercise. Examples of external styles are Shaolinquan, with its direct explosive attacks and many Wushu forms that have spectacular aerial techniques. External styles begin with a training focus on muscular power, speed and application, and generally integrate their qigong aspects in advanced training, after their desired "hard" physical level has been reached.

Currently, some people believe that there is no difference between "internal" and “external" systems of the Chinese martial arts,Wong Kiew Kit (2002). Art of Shaolin Kung Fu: The Secrets of Kung Fu for Self-Defense Health and Enlightenment. Tuttle. while other well known teachers have expressed differing opinions. For example, the Taijiquan teacher Wu Jianquan:

Those who practice Shaolinquan leap about with strength and force; people not proficient at this kind of training soon lose their breath and are exhausted. Taijiquan is unlike this. Strive for quiescence of body, mind and intention.

Current practice

Many internal schools teach forms that are practised for health benefits only. Thus, T'ai chi ch'uan in spite of its roots in martial arts has become similar in scope to Qigong, the purely meditative practice based on notions of circulation of qi. With purely a health emphasis, T'ai chi classes have become popular in hospitals, clinics, community and senior centers in the last twenty years or so, as baby boomers age and the art's reputation as a low stress training for seniors became better known.

Traditionalists feel that a school not teaching martial aspects somewhere in their syllabus cannot be said to be actually teaching the art itself, that they have accredited themselves prematurely. Traditional teachers also believe that understanding the core theoretical principles of neijia and the ability to apply them are a necessary gateway to health benefits.

Fiction
Internal styles have been associated in legend and in much popular fiction with the Taoist monasteries of the Wudang Mountains in central China.

Neijia are a common theme in Chinese wuxia novels and films, and are usually represented as originating in Wudang or similar mythologies. Often, genuine internal practices are highly exaggerated to the point of making them seem miraculous, as in the novels of Jin Yong and Gu Long.  Internal concepts have also been a source of comedy, such as in the films Shaolin Soccer and Kung Fu Hustle.

In the Naruto'' series, Neji Hyūga's name and techniques were based on neijia.

See also 
 Dantian
 Neidan
 Neo-Confucianism
 Taijitu
 Waijia

Citations

General bibliography

External links

 , a site devoted to original texts of Neigong, Qigong and Neijia.
 .
 .
 .
 .
 

 
Chinese martial arts
Chinese martial arts terminology